János Kovács (born 11 September 1985) is a Hungarian footballer who plays for Pénzügyőr SE as a defender. He has played for MTK, Bodajk, Chesterfield, York City, Lincoln City, Luton Town and Hereford United.

Club career

MTK
Born in Budapest, Kovács started his career with the youth system of hometown club MTK. He made his first team debut towards the end of the 2003–04 season, playing in a 2–1 defeat against Ferencváros in the Nemzeti Bajnokság I. He spent the 2004–05 season on loan with Bodajk, the reserve team of MTK, and played regularly for them in the Nemzeti Bajnokság II.

Chesterfield
Kovács joined English League One club Chesterfield on a two-year contract on 3 August 2005 following a trial with the club, with international clearance being received a week later on 11 August. He was sent-off in Chesterfield's game against Southend United on 18 February 2006, which the club appealed against. This was however rejected by The Football Association, who gave Kovács a one-match suspension.

Kovács joined York City in the Conference National on a one-month loan on 2 March 2007 and made his debut in a 0–0 home draw with Forest Green Rovers the following day. He scored in a 5–0 victory at Cambridge United and finished his spell with the club with eight appearances and one goal. His loan was not extended and so returned to Chesterfield after the completion of the spell, after which he made three appearances for the club as they were relegated to League Two. Kovács was offered a new one-year contract with Chesterfield at the end of the 2006–07 season, which he signed in May. He finished the 2007–08 season with 43 appearances 2 goals for Chesterfield and was runner-up in the club's CFSS player of year award.

Lincoln City
He was offered a new contract at the end of the season, but the likelihood of him signing decreased after Chesterfield signed Swansea City defender Kevin Austin. Lincoln City were revealed to be his likely destination by Chesterfield manager Lee Richardson, with a fee to be settled by a tribunal. Lincoln completed the signing on a two-year contract on 25 June 2008. Kovács scored in his first home appearance for the team with a headed equaliser in a pre-season friendly against Premier League side Aston Villa on 15 July 2008, which Lincoln eventually won 3–1. A Football League tribunal ordered Lincoln to pay a compensation fee of £17,500 for Kovács in August, and Chesterfield would also receive 20% of a sell-on fee. He made 66 appearances for Lincoln, scoring four goals, before being placed on the transfer list in January 2010.

Luton Town
On 26 January 2010, Kovács' contract with Lincoln was cancelled by mutual consent, and he subsequently signed for Conference Premier side Luton Town on a five-month contract. Luton fought off competition from English clubs Southend United and Barnet, as well as Hungarian side Ferencváros – the country's most successful club – to secure Kovács' signature. He made his debut in a 2–0 win at Histon on 27 January 2010, scoring the opening goal with a diving header from a Kevin Nicholls corner kick. Kovács made 17 appearances during his time at Luton.

Hereford United
His Luton contract expired in June 2010 and he signed a two-year contract with League Two side Hereford United on a free transfer later in the month. He made his Hereford debut in a 1–0 away win at Crewe Alexandra in which he scored his first goal for the club with a header from a James McQuilkin corner kick. He finished the season with 2 goals in 25 appearances for Hereford.

Return to Luton Town

After being transfer listed at the start of the 2011–12 season, Kovács joined former club Luton Town on an emergency one-month loan on 19 September 2011 during a period when the majority of the Luton defence had picked up injuries or suspensions. This loan was then extended until 1 January 2012. He was released by Hereford on 2 January 2012, signing permanently for Luton on a one-and-a-half-year contract. On Kovács signing a permanent contract Luton manager Gary Brabin said "János has been a rock at the back for us since joining us again. His performances have been fantastic and he has had an unbelievably positive effect on the team on and off the pitch." He made 44 appearances and scored 4 goals over the season for Luton, and won the Player of the Year Award for his performances. Kovács was also named in the 2011–12 Conference Premier Team of the Year alongside Luton teammate Mark Tyler. Manager John Still confirmed Kovács would be released at the end of the 2012–13 season, in which the player made 30 appearances and scored three goals.

International career
Kovács was capped by Hungary at youth and under-21 levels.

Career statistics

Honours
Individual
Conference Premier Team of the Year: 2011–12

References

External links

1985 births
Living people
Footballers from Budapest
Hungarian footballers
Hungarian expatriate footballers
Hungary youth international footballers
Hungary under-21 international footballers
Association football defenders
MTK Budapest FC players
Chesterfield F.C. players
York City F.C. players
Lincoln City F.C. players
Luton Town F.C. players
Hereford United F.C. players
Nemzeti Bajnokság I players
English Football League players
National League (English football) players
Expatriate footballers in England
Hungarian expatriate sportspeople in England